Osvaldo Giannini Iñíguez (6 April 1934−1 September 1999) was a Chilean lawyer and politician who served as deputy.

References

External Links
 Course Hero Profile 

1934 births
1999 deaths
People from Valparaíso
Chilean people of Italian descent
National Falange politicians
Christian Democratic Party (Chile) politicians
Christian Left (Chile) politicians
Deputies of the XLV Legislative Period of the National Congress of Chile
Deputies of the XLVI Legislative Period of the National Congress of Chile
Pontifical Catholic University of Valparaíso alumni